The Patrouille des Glaciers (PDG) is a ski mountaineering race organised every two years by the Swiss Armed Forces, in which military and civilian teams compete. It takes place once every two years at the end of April, in the south part of the canton of Valais below the summits of the Pennine Alps.

The Patrouille des Glaciers is a stage of La Grande Course that includes the most important ski mountaineering competitions of the season.
There are two different races, a normal and a short one:

Zermatt – Arolla – Verbier: 53 kilometres, altitude difference +3994m and – 4090m. This is equivalent to 110 km without altitude difference. 
Arolla – Verbier: 27 kilometres, altitude difference +1881m and – 2341m. This is equivalent to 53 km without altitude difference.

Each patrol consists of 3 members who, in order to compete, must
 have alpine experience which ensures their capability to independently master unexpected situations under extreme conditions in an inhospitable high-alpine environment
 train to meet the physical, mental and technical requirements of the competition
 be willing to live the ‘PDG spirit‘ towards their own team, all participants and organising staff by acting fair, with caution and solidarity recognizing their limits as well as respecting nature and the unique alpine world
 have excellent skiing skills, experience in skiing while being roped up to others, experience in alpine touring and mountaineering competitions
 be able to complete the races in the following times, given normal conditions: Zermatt – Schönbiel within 3h; Zermatt – Arolla within 8h 30min; Arolla – Riedmatten within 1h 45 min; Arolla – Verbier within 8h 30 min.

History 

The Patrouille des Glaciers has military origins. During the Second World War, the Swiss army organised a race to test the abilities of its soldiers. The first military patrol edition was held in April 1943 thanks to the work of two captains of Mountain Brigade 10 (Rodolphe Tissières and Roger Bonvin). That year, 18 patrols, each consisting of three members, travelled 63 kilometres to reach Verbier. In 1944, 44 teams participated, but for a few years, no races were organized because of war fatigue from the years of military mobilization during World War II. On April 10, 1949, the race was organised once again, but the deaths of three participants from Orsières (Mauritius Crettex, Robert Droz and Louis Thétaz) who died in a crevasse caused a controversy. As a result of that accident the organisation of the race was prohibited by the Federal Military Department until 1984.

The competition was revived by Rene Martin and Camille Bournissen. It remains under the control of the army which ensures its smooth running. The race is now held every two years and is also open to civilians. In 1986, bad weather forced organizers to interrupt the race. In 2002, the same mishap occurred.

In 2004, a foreign team won the race for the first time. The same year, the race was competed by 2934 participants (approximately 60% of civil patrols and 40% military), with 984 for the normal race, and 636 and 1314 for the short races.

In 2006, organisers were forced to refuse a thousand entries. That year a second race was organized from Zermatt for the first time. The media have recently raised the problem of doping: patrols are not subject to any controls which causes rumours about the performance of the participants. The commander of the race, Brigadier Marius Robyr (who retired in 2008), refused to impose controls and instead called for participants to act honestly, and in the spirit of the race in which there is no financial gain for the winners.

On April 18, 2007, memorials donated by the Swiss army were unveiled in Zermatt, Arolla and in Verbier in honour of the communities connected with, benefactors of, and friends of, the PDG. A doping case came to light at the end of the 2008 edition in which ten competitors were checked.

Records 
Record times are measured on the longer course only (i.e. from Zermatt to Verbier)

Men
The record time is 5 h 35'27 and is held by an Italian team winning the 2018 race. Team members are:

Michele Boscacci
Robert Antonioli
Matteo Eydallin

Women
The record time is 7 h 15'35 and is held by a French/Swiss team from the 2018 race. Team members are:

Axelle Mollaret
Laetitia Roux
Jennifer Fiechter

Checkpoints

Several supply and control stations are located between Zermatt and Verbier:

The total drop is 3994 meters (ascent) and  4090 meters (descent).

Rules 

Participants are divided into two groups: civilians and military. The categories are (Regulation 2006):

Female civilian patrols 
Male or mixed civilian patrols
Senior I (total age of three members less than 102 years) 
Senior II (total age of three members between 103 and 132 years) 
Senior III (patrols remaining) 
Female military patrols
International military patrols (only for normal race) 
Swiss military patrols 
Military I (total age of three members less than 102 years) 
Military II (total age of three members between 103 and 132 years) 
Military III (patrols remaining) 
Female international civilian patrols (only short race) 
Male international civilian patrols (only short race)

Material 
Each patrol must be equipped with the following equipment (Regulation 2006):

Ice axe
compass, altimeter 
three climbing harnesses 
pairs of gloves, hats, bags 
a Rope of at least 30 meters, snow shovel 
skis 
three headlamps, first aid kit, glasses 
Avalanche transceiver

See also 
Haute Route

References

External links

Official website
Swiss Air Force at Patrouille des Glaciers 2012
Swiss Army at Patrouille des Glaciers 2010
Swissinfo.org
Video

Ski mountaineering competitions
Mountaineering in the Alps
Military patrol (sport)
Skiing in Switzerland
Mountaineering in Switzerland
Bagnes
Skiing in the Alps